This is a list of slow rotators—minor planets that have an exceptionally long rotation period. This period, typically given in hours, and sometimes called rotation rate or spin rate, is a fundamental standard physical property for minor planets. In recent years, the periods of many thousands of bodies have been obtained from photometric and, to a lesser extent, radiometric observations.

The periods given in this list are sourced from the Light Curve Data Base (LCDB), which contains lightcurve data for more than 15,000 bodies. Most minor planets have rotation periods between 2 and 20 hours. , a group of approximately 650 bodies, typically measuring 1–20 kilometers in diameter, have periods of more than 100 hours or 4 days. Among the slowest rotators, there are currently 15 bodies with a period longer than 1000 hours. According to the Minor Planet Center, the sharp lower limit of approximately 2.2 hours is due to the fact that most smaller bodies are thought to be rubble piles – conglomerations of smaller pieces, loosely coalesced under the influence of gravity – that fly apart if the period is shorter than this limit. The few minor planets rotating faster than 2.2 hours, therefore, can not be merely held together by self-gravity, but must be formed of a contiguous solid.

Potentially slow rotators have only an inaccurate period, estimated based on a fragmentary lightcurve and inconclusive measurement. They are listed separately from the more precise periods, which have a LCDB quality code, U, of 2 or 3 (unambiguous result). The periods for potentially slow rotators may be completely wrong (U = 1), have no complete and conclusive result (U = n.a.), or large error margins of more than 30% (U = 2−). A trailing plus sign (+) or minus sign (–) indicate slightly better or worse quality, respectively, than the unsigned value.

As with orbital periods, a rotational period can be sidereal or synodic to describe a full rotation with respect to the fixed stars (sidereal) and Sun (synodic), respectively. In most cases, the periods given in this list are synodic, not sidereal. However, in most cases the difference between these two different measures is not significant. This is the case for all main-belt asteroids, which account for 97.5% of all minor planets.

Slowest rotators 

This list contains the slowest-rotating minor planets with periods of at least 1000 hours, or 41 days. See  for minor planets with an insufficiently accurate period—that is, a LCDB quality code of less than 2.

Periods between 500 and 1000 hours

Periods of 400+ hours

Periods of 300+ hours

Periods of 200+ hours

Periods of 100+ hours

Potentially slow rotators 

Potentially slow rotators have their rotation period estimated based on a fragmentary light curve. They are listed separately from the more reliable results above, that have a quality code (U) of 2 or higher. The periods for potentially slow rotators may be completely wrong (U=1), have no complete and conclusive result (U=n.a.), a large error margins of more than 30% (U=2−), or anything in between.

Possible periods above 1000 hours

Possible periods between 500 and 1000 hours

Possible periods of 400+ hours

Possible periods of 300+ hours

Possible periods of 200+ hours

Possible periods of 100+ hours

See also 
 Light curve
 List of exceptional asteroids
 List of minor planets

References

External links 
 Asteroid Lightcurve Database (LCDB), query form (info)
 Asteroids and comets rotation curves, CdR – Observatoire de Genève, Raoul Behrend
 Asteroid Lightcurve Photometry Database, Brian D. Warner
 JPL Small-Body Database Browser

Slow rotators (minor planets)
rotators, slow